Robert Wolff may refer to:

Bobby Wolff (born 1932), American bridge player 
Bob Wolff (1920–2017), American sportscaster
Robert Paul Wolff (born 1933), American political philosopher
Robert Jay Wolff (1905–1978), American abstract artist
Robert Lee Wolff (1915–1980), American historian and book collector

See also
Robert Wolf (disambiguation)
Robert Wolfe (disambiguation)